The Bold and the Beautiful is an American television soap opera. It was first broadcast on March 23, 1987, and airs on CBS. The following is a list of characters debuting in 2017, by order of first appearance. All characters are introduced by the series' executive producer and head writer Bradley Bell, and co-head writer Michael Minnis.

Sally Spectra

Sally Spectra, played by Courtney Hope, first appeared on January 31, 2017. In March 2018, it was announced that Hope would exit the role of Sally. She made her last appearance on April 5, 2018. On April 19, 2018, Hope announced she was back filming as Sally and she made her re-appearance on June 15, 2018.  In August 2020, Hope announced that she has been let go from the series, making her last appearance on August 5, 2020. Later in the month, it was announced that the actress would be joining the cast of The Young and the Restless. In October 2020, it was revealed that Hope would be portraying Sally Spectra crossing her over to ‘’Y&R’’. She made her first appearance on November 3, 2020.

The Bold and the Beautiful

Sally is the grandniece of Sally Spectra (Darlene Conley) and the granddaughter of Sally's sister, Shirley Spectra (Patrika Darbo),

Bill Spencer Jr. (Don Diamont) and C.J. Garrison (Mick Cain) make an agreement for him to purchase the land in which Spectra Fashions sat, and to knock the building down for land clearance to build a new Spencer Publications office. This job would take six months to prepare, which gave C.J. enough time to see younger (first cousin once removed) Sally Spectra off, in an attempt to re-open Spectra's doors as a fashion house to rival Forrester Creations, repeating history.
Sally hires a team resembling that of the old Spectra Fashions gang and - in the best, most efficient way possible - by hiring their relatives! Joining this also larger-than-life Sally are her grandmother Shirley, Saul Feinberg's grandson Saul Feinberg Jr. (Alex Wyse) and Darlita (Danube Hermosillo) the receptionist, who has no relation to Darla Forrester (Schae Harrison).

Sally is shown having a cocktail at LL Giardino flirting with a bar tender, when she is called by her great aunt, the original Sally Spectra to save the old Spectra building and revive Spectra Fashions. Sally begins building a social media presence by pulling hamulating stunts at Steffy Forrester's (Jacqueline MacInnes Wood) expense to garner free publicity and media attention for Spectra fashions. She begins dating Thomas Forrester (Pierson Fodé) and builds a relationship with him. Her grandmother Shirley (Patrika Darbo) whom Sally refers to as "grams" pushes her to leave Thomas, fearing it might take her focus away from reviving Spectra Fashions. She invites eye on fashion reporter Jarrett Maxwell (Andrew Collins) who works for Spencers publications to an early preview of Spectra fashions. Maxwell takes a liking to Sally's designs angering his boss Bill Spencer. Bill writes a disparaging article against Sally and Spectra fashions while using Maxwell's name on the article, in an attempt to destroy the business and quickly push through the sale of the old Spectra building.

This causes a major setback for Sally, but she continues on to rebuild Spectra Fashions with similar tactics done by her grandaunt Sally. Her grandmother Shirley secretly places a hidden camera on her sister Coco (Courtney Grosbeck). Coco heads off to work as an intern at Forrester Creations. Coco remains unaware of the hidden camera, allowing both Shirley and Sally access to all of Forrester's fashion designs before their runway debut.

Sally tries to break up with Thomas in an attempt absolves herself of any guilt from stealing Foresters designs, causing suspicion from Steffy who confronts her about it. Sally mimics all of Forrester's designs with slight alterations and launches her runway debut a day earlier to the Forresters. The runway debut becomes a success and angers Steffy who accuses Coco of betrayal and nearly causing her to lose her job. However this success becomes short-lived when the Forresters sues Sally and Sally is arrested and charged with grand larceny and industrial espionage. This causes Spectra fashions to temporarily cease all operations. Thomas decides to help Sally by buying the Spectra building against Bill and investing millions, reviving Spectra fashions once again. He becomes co-partner with Sally and head designer of the business.

Bill goes all out in taking Sally down from rigging a charitable fashion contest between Forrester Creations and Spectra fashions to having his attorney Justin Barber (Aaron D. Spears) set the Spectra building on fire after learning that the building has electrical and wiring issues. Sally's business goes up in flames and Thomas leaves her after Bills lies to him telling him that his niece Caroline (Linsey Godfrey) whom Thomas  shares a child with is dying.

Sally is left no options but to sell the building to Bill. However Bill's son Liam (Scott Clifton) temporarily takes over as CEO from his father and gifts Sally the deed to her building out of compassion. However that gift becomes voided due to legal loop holes found by Justin allowing Bill to go ahead with demolishing the building.

On the day of the demolition, Sally and her crew decides to stage a protest inside the old Spectra building preventing Bill from demolishing it. Bill threatens them out, but Liam decides to return along with Sally. Justin tries to text Bill, warning him that Liam and Sally were still inside but Bill does not sees this text until after he pulls the trigger blowing up the Spectra lot. Under the rubbles of the building, Sally and Liam are trapped, the two share a kiss thinking that they were not going to survive. Bill and Steffy manages to rescue them.

Sally briefly leaves along with the rest of the Spectra team. She returns a few month later as a designer for Forrester creations and has a brief relationship with Wyatt Spencer (Darin Brooks). Wyatt tries to dump her when his former high school girlfriend Flo Fulton (Katrina Bowden) comes to town. Sally becomes jealous of Flo and highly obsessive of Wyatt. She fakes having a terminal illness in order to keep Wyatt away from her. She does this with the help of Dr. Penny Escobar (Monica Ruiz). Flo finds out and is knocked out by Penny while Sally decides to abduct Flo and chain her to the radiator in her apartment. Flo manages to message help to Wyatt by writing on Sally's undergarments and is saved by Wyatt. The two decides not to press charge against Sally and Penny, but Wyatt tells Sally to leave Los Angeles so both sides are able to heal and move on.

The Young and the Restless

After leaving her life in Los Angeles and Forrester Creations behind, Sally decides to move to Genoa City, Wisconsin. She gets hired by Lauren Fenmore (Tracey E. Bregman) as her executive assistant at Jabot. During her time there, she forms rivalries with Summer Newman (Hunter King) and her fiancée Kyle Abbott (Michael Mealor). She also develops a love interest on Kyle's father Jack Abbott (Peter Bergman) to Phyllis (Michelle Stafford) dismay.

Summer becomes threaten by Sally fearing that Sally might go after her job. Summer starts digging into Sally's past, trying to find any leverage to use against Sally despite Kyle warning her not to turn Sally into a threat. She flies to Los Angeles and talks to Wyatt Spencer (Brooks) and Flo Fulton (Bowden). Wyatt decides not expose Sally out of respect but Flo tells Summer everything. Summer uses it against Sally and taunts her with it. This causes Sally to retaliate. She is unable to find anything to use against Summer but is able find something against Kyle. Theo Vanderway (Tyler Johnson) Kyle's cousin decides to give Sally leverage against Summer and Kyle. He tells Sally of Kyle's secret affair and child with Tara Locke (Elizabeth Leiner), who happens to be married to a ruthless businessman named Ashland Locke (Richard Burgi).

Sally tells Kyle that she knows about his secret affair with Tara, which Kyle tells Summer about prompting both sides to cease fire.

Phyllis continues to warn Jack about Sally to no avail and tries to run Sally out of town by asking Lauren to relocate her back to Los Angeles. Sally goes after Summer's job and hatches a scheme with the help of Tara. She flies back to Los Angeles to meet with Eric Forrester (John McCook), she asks Eric for help in securing a prominent fashion job for Summer in Milan on the promise that she leave the Forresters and Spencers alone.

Back in Genoa City, Tara threatens Summer by taking Harrison (Kyle's son) away if she does not leave Kyle. Summer reluctantly agrees and leaves for Milan after receiving a prominent fashion job offer. She tells Lauren to give her job to Sally which raises suspicions with Phyllis.

Phyllis investigates and finds evidence against Sally. She has Sally's accomplice Tara arrested for fraud and embezzlement and exposes Sally's schemes to both Lauren and Jack. Lauren fires Sally and Jack ends his relationship with her. Sally becomes briefly unemployed but is recruited by Chloe Mitchell (Elizabeth Hendrickson) as a segment producer for Newman Media. She helps Chloe launch the company's fashions platform 'Newman Fashions'. Sally also begins a relationship with Adam Newman (Mark Grossman) which raises concerns with Chloe. Victor Newman (Eric Braeden) warns Adam not to date Sally. Adam decides to keep a professional working relationship between himself and Sally but begins to have feelings for her.

Sally schemes again after overhearing Victoria Newman (Amelia Heinle) discussing wedding gown options with her former boss Lauren. Sally sketches out a wedding dress personally for Victoria and plans to switch Lauren's dress with hers on the day of Victoria's wedding to Ashland Locke. She flies to Tuscany as Adam's plus one and manages to switch out both dress. She later makes a desperate plea to Victoria to wear her dress which Victoria agrees to. The dress gains widespread publicity for both Sally and Newman Media and angers Lauren causing a strain in her family relationship with Chloe.

Adam's ex-wife Chelsea (Melissa Claire Egan) returns to town and joins Newman Fashions. She meets Sally, but takes no liking to her, knowing her past history and Sally knows about Chelsea's past history. Chelsea admits to having strong feelings for Adam despite her previous attempt for framing him for attempted murder of Ray Rosales (Jordi Vilasuso). She becomes increasingly jealous of Sally after learning from Chloe that Sally might be dating Adam. She catches both Adam and Sally hanging out in Adam's Office on New Year's Eve to which Chelsea confronts Adam about. Later, Chelsea wants Sally fired and pushes Chloe multiple times to fire Sally, but Chloe refuses due to Sally's talents.

When Victor sells Newman Media to Victoria and her company Newman-Locke, the fate of Newman Fashions remains in question. Chelsea and Chloe begs Victoria not to pull the plug on Newman Fashions, but Victoria does so, expressing no further interest. This prompt Chelsea and Chloe to form their own start up company, however Chelsea insist that Sally does not join them. Chelsea and Chloe breaks the news to Sally and tells hers that its time to them to go their own separate ways. Sally feels betrayed and accuses Chelsea and Chloe of trying to oust her in an attempt to form their own company. She mocks Chelsea and calls Chloe a fool for listening to Chelsea.

Later on, after learning of Sally's situation, Adam decides to give Sally a business executive position at Newman Media. Sally is hired as a COO (Chief operating officer) for the company. She admits to Adam that she has strong feelings for him. Adam also admits that he wants her. The two caves in to their desires and made love on Valentines day.

Following the news that Ashland Locke (Robert Newman) faked having cancer, Sally comes clean with Adam and discloses her own past of doing the same thing with Wyatt. She becomes very supportive of Adam and often tries to guide him to the best often right direction. When Adam loses his temporary position of CEO and position of CO-CEO and her mother Nikki Newman (Melody Thomas Scott) of Newman Enterprises, Sally advises Adam to leave knowing he will never be fairly treated by his father Victor and the Newman's. Adam refuses and tells Sally he wants full control of Newman Enterprises to which Sally agrees to help. Later on Sally sees Victoria at Society and tries to persuade her into taking her ex-husband Ashland back.

Victoria eventually caves into her feelings and takes Ashland back, angering Victor and leading to a massive feud between the two. Victoria leaves her CEO position at Newman Enterprises paving the way for Adam to takeover. Sally than takes Adam's place as the new CEO of Newman Media. Sally also offer her previous Job as COO to Chloe when Chloe starts to have problems with Chelsea on their new start up with Lauren.

Adam and Sally's position at Newman becomes jeopardized when Victoria reveal's that she staged everything in order to gain Ashland's trust and retrieve the remaining $250 million of the $500 million that was paid out to him by Victor. Adam become infuriated knowing that Victoria will come back for her CEO position. Victor reinstates Victoria and his wife Nikki as co-CEOs of Newman Enterprises with Nick (Joshua Murrow) returning as the company's new COO.

At Chancellor Park, Jack sees a frustrated Sally sitting on the bench, she vents out her frustrations to Jack about how badly Victor and the rest of the Newman family continue to mistreat Adam. Jack tells her that the Newman's has always been complicated as Victor tends to constantly manipulate his children's. He tells Sally that that he is happy that she and Adam found each other but warns her that Adam has a tendency to overreact when emotionally wounded and that Sally should take care of herself.

Sally returns to her office seeing Adam in his dark state. She offers to take back her position of COO if Adam wanted his CEO position of Newman Media back. Adam refuses and reassures her that he has intention of taking it back and wants her to have it. She knows that Adam had recently talked to Ashland and pleas him not to let Ashland exploits his anger and go down the path of revenge against the Newman's as it will backfire. Adam decides to leave Newman Media.

Adam later breaks up with Sally and Sally moves on and dates his brother Nick (Murrow). She remains as CEO of Newman Media temporarily until Victoria replaces her with Nate Hastings (Sean Dominic). Later, she and Adam have a goodbye sex, which leads her to become pregnant with his child.

Shirley Spectra

Shirley Spectra, played by Patrika Darbo, first appeared on February 1, 2017. In March 2018, Darbo announced she had departed the cast, due to the end of the Spectra storyline. She made her last appearance on March 5, 2018. Darbo returned on November 8, 2018, for a brief appearance.  She has also made appearances via video on sister soap Young and the Restless.

Shirley is the sister of Sally Spectra (Darlene Conley) and she arrives in Los Angeles to help her granddaughter, also named Sally (Courtney Hope), re-open Spectra Fashions.

Saul Feinberg

Saul Feinberg II, played by Alex Wyse, first appeared on February 3, 2017. In March 2018, it was announced that Wyse had departed the cast, due to the end of the Spectra storyline.

Saul is the grandson of Saul Feinberg, the tailor of Spectra Fashions and friend of Sally Spectra (Conley). Saul is hired by Sally's namesake, Sally Spectra (Hope), as tailor like his grandfather to help re-open Spectra Fashions. He is shown to be insecure at times due his to feelings for Sally.

Darlita
Darlita, played by Danube Hermosillo, first appeared February 9, 2017. is Sally's unpaid receptionist at Spectra fashions. Her name and character is a take on Darla Forrester (Schae Harrison) whom was previously a receptionist at Spectra.  She is portrayed as dimwitted in her job and frequently speaks incoherently, despite her best efforts. Prior to the launch of Spectra fashions, Saul (Alex Wyse) introduces Darlita to Sally (Courtney Hope) as a protentional hire. Sally is reluctant at first prompting Darlita to make a passionate but humorless plea. She tells Sally that if she hires her now "she'll live to regret it" when she actually meant to say "she won't regret it". Sally hires her anyway and throughout the season, the character has been used multiple times for comedic scenes. In March 2018, it was announced she would departed the cast, due to the end of the Spectra storyline.

Darlita is introduced as the newly hired receptionist at Spectra Fashions.

Coco Spectra

Coco Spectra, played by Courtney Grosbeck, first appeared on February 24, 2017.

Coco is the teen sister of Sally Spectra (Hope), the grand-niece of Sally Spectra (Conley) and the granddaughter of Sally's sister, Shirley Spectra (Darbo). She was previously an intern at Forrester Creations and briefly dated RJ Forrester (Anthony Turpei).

Mateo
Mateo, played by Francisco San Martin, first appeared on October 2, 2017.

Mateo is introduced as the Forrester Estate manager, who is hired by Sheila Carter (Kimberlin Brown) to seduce Quinn Fuller (Rena Sofer), and cause her to betray Eric Forrester (John McCook)'s trust and have an affair, leading to the eventual end of their marriage.

References

External links
Characters and cast at the Official The Bold and the Beautiful website 
Characters and cast at the IMDb

, Bold and the Beautiful
, 2017